Shooting at the 2019 Military World Games was held in Wuhan, China from 19 to 25 October 2019.

Medal summary

Men

Women

Mixed

References 
 2019 Military World Games Results - Page 215

Military World Games
Shooting
2019
2019